Novolyalinsky District is an administrative district (raion), one of the thirty in Sverdlovsk Oblast, Russia. As a municipal division, it is incorporated as Novolyalinsky Urban Okrug. Its administrative center is the town of Novaya Lyalya. Population: 23,564 (2010 Census);  The population of Novaya Lyalya accounts for 54.0% of the district's total population.

References

Notes

Sources

Districts of Sverdlovsk Oblast